Alen Pajenk (born 23 April 1986) is a Slovenian volleyball player who plays for Olympiacos Praeus and the Slovenian national team. With Slovenia, he was the runner-up of the European Volleyball Championship three times, in 2015, 2019 and 2021.

Career

Club
In 2013, Pajenk moved to Jastrzębski Węgiel. In 2013–14, he reached the Final Four of the Champions League and won the bronze medal after defeating VC Zenit Kazan. Jastrzębski Węgiel, including Pajenk, also finished in third place in the Polish Championship during the same season.

National team
On 14 August 2015, Slovenia, including Pajenk, won the 2015 European League. On 18 October 2015, he won the silver medal with Slovenia at the 2015 European Championship.

Honours
OK Maribor
Slovenian Cup: 2005–06

ACH Volley
Slovenian Championship: 2007–08, 2008–09, 2009–10
Slovenian Cup: 2007–08, 2008–09, 2009–10

Volley Lube
Italian Championship: 2011–12
Italian Supercup: 2012–13

Fenerbahçe İstanbul
Turkish Cup: 2016–17

Olympiacos Piraeus
CEV Challenge Cup: 2022–23

Individual
CEV Champions League Best Spiker: 2021–22
Men's European Volleyball League Best Server: 2011

References

External links

 
 Player profile at LegaVolley.it 
 Player profile at PlusLiga.pl   
 Player profile at Volleybox.net 

1986 births
Living people
Sportspeople from Maribor
Slovenian men's volleyball players
Slovenian Champions of men's volleyball
Italian Champions of men's volleyball
Mediterranean Games medalists in volleyball
Mediterranean Games bronze medalists for Slovenia
Competitors at the 2009 Mediterranean Games
Slovenian expatriate sportspeople in Italy
Expatriate volleyball players in Italy
Slovenian expatriate sportspeople in Poland
Expatriate volleyball players in Poland
Slovenian expatriate sportspeople in Turkey
Expatriate volleyball players in Turkey
Slovenian expatriate sportspeople in France
Expatriate volleyball players in France
Slovenian expatriate sportspeople in Greece
Expatriate volleyball players in Greece
Blu Volley Verona players
Jastrzębski Węgiel players
Fenerbahçe volleyballers
Czarni Radom players
Olympiacos S.C. players
Middle blockers